Deewana Deewani  is a 2013 Romantic Odia language film directed by Ashok Pati. The film's music director was Prasant Padhi. This film starring Babushaan, Madhumita Chakraborty, Mihir Das, Minaketan Das in the lead roles.

Cast
 Babushaan
 Madhumita Chakraborty
 Mihir Das
 Minaketan Das
 Debashis Parta
 Pintu Nanda
 Runu Parija
 Sasmita Pradhan

Soundtrack

References

External links
 

2010s Odia-language films
2013 films
Films directed by Ashok Pati